The Nandewar Range, a mountain range that is part of the Great Dividing Range, is located in the North West Slopes region of New South Wales, Australia.

John Oxley was the first European to see the range in 1818 as he explored the New South Wales.

Location and features
The range is located on the western, inland, side of the New England region, and generally forms the watershed divide between the Namoi River and Gwydir River catchment basins to the south and north respectively. The Macdonald River starting south of Walcha drains west to Warrabah National Park where it changes its name to the Namoi then is added to by the Manilla River, Peel River and Mooki River. The Horton River runs north to the Gwydir. Both rivers together drain segments of the Nandewar Range.

The eastern part of the Nandewar Range starts at the Great Dividing Range south of Uralla. The main road between Barraba and Bingara crosses the range. At its western end, the Nandewar Range culminates at Mount Kaputar, a complex of volcanic origin, from which there are views of the flat inland plains of New South Wales.

The foothill areas of the Nandewar Range are used for grazing and cropping. There are forests in some of the higher areas.  The Mount Kaputar area is included in Mount Kaputar National Park.

The range is occasionally dusted with light snow in winter.

Geology
The range is the remnants of an eroded basaltic shield volcano that formed about 18 million years ago. Some of the exposed rocks in the area are 230 million years old.

Etymology
The first is a volcanic plug called 'Ninghdoo' (pronounced locally as Ningy-doo) or 'Nungadhun'. The names Nandewar, Kaputar and Ninghdoo are the Gamilaraay language names for these features.

Peaks
Mountains within the Nandewar Range include;
 Bushy Mountain,
 Castletop Mountain
 Gins Mountain
 Grattai Mountain,
 Mount Dowe,
 Mount Kaputar,
 Mount Lawler
 Mount Lindesay,
 Mount Ningadhun,
 Mount Waa
 Mount Yulludunida
 Round Mountain

See also

 List of mountains in New South Wales
 Warrumbungles

References

External links

Mountain ranges of New South Wales
Shield volcanoes of Australia
Miocene shield volcanoes
Extinct volcanoes
North West Slopes
Polygenetic shield volcanoes